Erivaldo da Cruz Vieira (born 19 November 1980 in Assis) is a Brazilian long jumper.

He finished sixth at the 2006 IAAF World Indoor Championships in Moscow in an indoor personal best of 7.97 metres.

His overall personal best jump is 8.18 metres, achieved in June 2006 in Cochabamba.

Achievements

External links

1980 births
Living people
Brazilian male long jumpers
Athletes (track and field) at the 2007 Pan American Games
Pan American Games athletes for Brazil